José Fernández Díaz (September 5, 1908 – October 11, 1979), commonly known as Joseíto Fernández, was a Cuban singer and songwriter. He is the writer of well-known songs, including "Elige tú, que canto yo", "Amor de madre", "Demuéstrame tú", and "Así son, boncó", as well as the most famous "Guajira Guantanamera".

Selected compositions 
 "Tu Misma Me Acostumbraste," Joseíto Fernández (w&m)
 "Mi Madre y Mi Tierra," Joseíto Fernández (w&m)
 "Guantanamera," Joseíto Fernández (w&m), based on a poem by José Martí © 1960
 "Los Babilonios," Joseíto Fernández (words), Ernesto Pérez (es) (music)
 "Elige Tú, Que Canto Yo," Joseíto Fernández (w&m) © 1959
 "Así Son, Boncó," Joseíto Fernández (w&m) © 1960

References

Cuban songwriters
Male songwriters
1979 deaths
1908 births
20th-century Cuban male singers